Ophiusa pelor is a moth of the family Erebidae. It is found in Madagascar.

References
  (1989). Lepidopterorum Catalogus (New Series) Fascicle 118, Noctuidae. CRC Press. , 

Ophiusa
Moths of Madagascar
Moths of Africa
Moths described in 1881